The Poland men's national under-18 and under-19 basketball team is a national basketball team of Poland, administered by the Polish Basketball Federation. It represents the country in international under-18 and under-19 basketball competitions.

FIBA U18 European Championship participations

FIBA Under-19 Basketball World Cup participations

See also
Poland men's national basketball team
Poland men's national under-17 basketball team
Poland women's national under-19 basketball team

References

External links
 Official website
 Archived records of Poland team participations

U
National youth sports teams of Poland
Men's national under-18 basketball teams
Men's national under-19 basketball teams